Polk County is a county  in the U.S. state of Wisconsin.  As of the 2020 census, the population was 44,977.  Its county seat is Balsam Lake. The county was created in 1853.

Geography

Adjacent counties
 Burnett County - north
 Barron County - east
 Dunn County - southeast
 St. Croix County - south
 Washington County, Minnesota - southwest
 Chisago County, Minnesota - west

Major highways

Railroads
Canadian National
Minnesota Transportation Museum

Buses
List of intercity bus stops in Wisconsin

Airports
 Amery Municipal Airport (KAHH) serves the county and surrounding communities.
 L.O. Simenstad Municipal Airport (KOEO).

National protected area
 Saint Croix National Scenic Riverway (part)

Demographics

2020 census
As of the census of 2020, the population was 44,977. The racial makeup of the county was 93.5% White, 0.9% Native American, 0.5% Asian, 0.4% Black or African American, 0.8% from other races, and 3.9% from two or more races. Ethnically, the population was 2.1% Hispanic or Latino of any race.

2000 census

As of the 2000 census, there were 41,319 people, 16,254 households, and 11,329 families residing in the county. The population density was 45 people per square mile (17/km2). There were 21,129 housing units at an average density of 23 per square mile (9/km2). The racial makeup of the county was 97.64% White, 0.15% Black or African American, 1.06% Native American, 0.26% Asian, 0.02% Pacific Islander, 0.20% from other races, and 0.67% from two or more races.  0.80% of the population were Hispanic or Latino of any race. 31.4% were of German, 18.6% Norwegian, 11.3% Swedish, 5.5% Irish and 5.3% American ancestry.

There were 16,254 households, out of which 32.10% had children under the age of 18 living with them, 58.20% were married couples living together, 7.40% had a female householder with no husband present, and 30.30% were non-families. 25.20% of all households were made up of individuals, and 10.60% had someone living alone who was 65 years of age or older. The average household size was 2.51 and the average family size was 3.01.

In the county, the population was spread out, with 26.20% under the age of 18, 6.70% from 18 to 24, 27.70% from 25 to 44, 24.30% from 45 to 64, and 15.10% who were 65 years of age or older. The median age was 39 years. For every 100 females there were 99.90 males. For every 100 females age 18 and over, there were 98.50 males.

In 2017, there were 400 births, giving a general fertility rate of 56.0 births per 1000 women aged 15–44, the 14th lowest rate out of all 72 Wisconsin counties.

Education

Communities

Cities
 Amery
 St. Croix Falls

Villages

 Balsam Lake (county seat)
 Centuria
 Clayton
 Clear Lake
 Dresser
 Frederic
 Luck
 Milltown
 Osceola
 Turtle Lake (mostly in Barron County)

Towns

 Alden
 Apple River
 Balsam Lake
 Beaver
 Black Brook
 Bone Lake
 Clam Falls
 Clayton
 Clear Lake
 Eureka
 Farmington
 Garfield
 Georgetown
 Johnstown
 Laketown
 Lincoln
 Lorain
 Luck
 McKinley
 Milltown
 Osceola
 St. Croix Falls
 Sterling
 West Sweden

Census-designated place
 Lewis

Unincorporated communities

 Atlas
 Bunyan
 Clam Falls
 Cushing
 Deronda
 East Farmington
 Eureka Center
 Fox Creek
 Horse Creek
 Indian Creek
 Joel
 Lamar
 Little Falls
 Lykens
 McKinley
 Nye
 Pole Cat Crossing (partial)
 Range
 Richardson
 Sand Lake
 Ubet
 Wanderoos
 West Denmark
 West Sweden
 Wolf Creek

Notable residents
 Arnold Franz Brasz (1888–1966), a prominent painter, sculptor, and printmaker was born in Polk County on July 19, 1888
 George A. Nelson (1873–1962), the 1936 Socialist Party of America nominee for vice president of the United States, was born in rural Polk County and was a dairy farmer there.

Politics

See also
 National Register of Historic Places listings in Polk County, Wisconsin

References

Further reading
 Prentice, Worthy A. Reminiscences of Early Pioneer Days in Polk County. Balsam Lake, Wis,: Polk County Ledger, n.d..

External links
 Polk County website
 Polk County map from the Wisconsin Department of Transportation
 Polk County Economic Development Corporation
 Polk County Tourism

 
1853 establishments in Wisconsin
Populated places established in 1853